Cashew MRT station is an underground Mass Rapid Transit (MRT) station on the Downtown line, located on the boundary of Bukit Panjang and Bukit Batok planning areas, Singapore.

Named after Cashew Road, it provides MRT access to a private residential estate along the Upper Bukit Timah corridor. It is the nearest MRT station to the headquarters of the Ministry of Defence.

Art in Transit
"Project Eden" by Donna Ong is an artwork that pays homage to the island's creative high-rise gardeners and metamorphoses them into "flowers" and "grasses" of picturesque gardens.

Exits
A: Assumption English School, Fajar Secondary School, St. Joseph Church

References

Railway stations in Singapore opened in 2015
Bukit Panjang
Mass Rapid Transit (Singapore) stations